The Hart–Devlin debate was a famous debate in the mid-twentieth century between legal philosophers Patrick Devlin and H. L. A. Hart about whether the law is a suitable tool for the enforcement of morality. The debate arose in the context of a proposal to decriminalize homosexuality in the United Kingdom. Devlin argued that the law is a suitable tool to enforce morality, while Hart disagreed.

See also
Legal moralism

Sources

 
 
 

 
 
 

Philosophy of law
Criminalization of homosexuality